Countries could enter one team in the doubles tournament and three athletes in the singles tournament. Seeding will be based on ATP and WTA rankings at the time of the draw (October 16).

Summary

Qualifiers
Players entered in the singles events will contest the doubles events as well.
Rankings as of August 29, 2011.

Men's singles

Women's singles

References

Qualification
Qualification for the 2011 Pan American Games